"The Story of Adidon" is a diss track by American rapper Pusha T aimed at Canadian rapper Drake, released on May 29, 2018. It reuses the instrumental track from Jay-Z's "The Story of O.J.", which was produced by No I.D. and sampled "Four Women" by Nina Simone. The diss track received significant media attention, while Drake received criticism.

Background
On May 25, 2018, Pusha T released his third studio album, Daytona. The album's last track, "Infrared," addressed allegations regarding Drake and ghostwriting. Drake responded by releasing the diss track "Duppy Freestyle" a few hours later. The song garnered significant media attention, as well as a response from Pusha T on Twitter. Pusha T responded to the track by releasing "The Story of Adidon" four days later.

Synopsis
In the diss track, Pusha T raps over the instrumental of Jay-Z's 2017 song "The Story of O.J." from his 13th studio album 4:44. Pusha T alleges that the rumor that Drake had a child named Adonis with French model and former porn star Sophie Brussaux is true, calling Drake a "deadbeat" who is "hiding a child." Pusha T also attacks Drake's alleged insecurities regarding his own race, and mocks OVO Sound record producer 40 for looking frail, which may be due to having multiple sclerosis. The track received high praise for being vicious and harsh, as well as for revealing Drake had a secret child that he was hiding from the public eye. After a month of speculation, Drake finally confirmed he had a son with Brussaux, in lyrics from his fifth studio album Scorpion.

The track was titled "The Story of Adidon" after Drake's rumored upcoming Adidas line, which would have publicly revealed Adonis to the world and used him heavily in promotion and advertising. Adidon is a portmanteau of Adidas and Adonis.

Artwork
The cover features a 2007 photograph taken by David Leyes of Drake in blackface. Though Drake has never responded to the diss track, he has commented on the cover, saying "the photos represented how African Americans were once wrongfully portrayed in entertainment" and how these frustrations had not changed since.

Critical reception
Upon release, Pitchfork deemed "The Story of Adidon" as Best New Track and later listed the track as the 31st best song of 2018.

"The Story of Adidon" was named song of the year by Noisey. Complex listed it fifth in its songs of the year list, and praised the first verse as the best rap verse of 2018. The Tampa Bay Times ranked "The Story of Adidon" at number 10 on their "50 Best Songs of 2018" list.

See also 
List of notable diss tracks

References 

2018 songs
Pusha T songs
Diss tracks
Drake (musician)
Jay-Z
Nina Simone
Song recordings produced by No I.D.
Songs written by Pusha T